Phillip Forman (November 30, 1895 – August 17, 1978) was a United States circuit judge of the United States Court of Appeals for the Third Circuit and previously was a United States district judge of the United States District Court for the District of New Jersey.

Education and career
Born in New York, New York on November 30, 1895, Forman received a Bachelor of Laws in 1919 from the Temple University Beasley School of Law. He served in the United States Navy from 1917 to 1919 during World War I era. He entered private practice in Trenton, New Jersey from 1919 to 1932. He was an Assistant United States Attorney for the District of New Jersey from 1923 to 1928 and was the United States Attorney for the District of New Jersey from 1928 to 1932.

Federal judicial service
Forman was nominated by President Herbert Hoover on June 11, 1932, to a seat on the United States District Court for the District of New Jersey vacated by Judge William Nelson Runyon. He was confirmed by the United States Senate on June 23, 1932, and received his commission on June 25, 1932. He served as Chief Judge from 1951 to 1959 and as a member of the Judicial Conference of the United States from 1957 to 1959. His service terminated on September 20, 1959, due to his elevation to the Third Circuit.

Forman was nominated by President Dwight D. Eisenhower on February 9, 1959, to a seat on the United States Court of Appeals for the Third Circuit vacated by Judge Albert Branson Maris. He was confirmed by the Senate on September 9, 1959, and received his commission the next day. He assumed senior status on March 31, 1961. His service terminated on August 17, 1978, due to his death.

Notable grants of citizenship

In 1940, Forman gave the German physicist Albert Einstein his United States Citizenship. He served the same role for the mathematician Kurt Gödel.

References

Sources

1895 births
1978 deaths
20th-century American judges
Assistant United States Attorneys
Judges of the United States Court of Appeals for the Third Circuit
Judges of the United States District Court for the District of New Jersey
Lawyers from New York City
New Jersey lawyers
Temple University Beasley School of Law alumni
United States Attorneys for the District of New Jersey
United States court of appeals judges appointed by Dwight D. Eisenhower
United States district court judges appointed by Herbert Hoover
United States Navy sailors